Cochylidia liui is a species of moth of the family Tortricidae. It is found in Guizhou, China.

The ground colour of the forewings is pale yellowish white, mixed with brownish black and pale ochreous brown. The hindwings are grey.

Etymology
The species is named in honour of Professor Youqiao Liu.

References

External links

Cochylini
Moths described in 2012
Moths of Asia